Colaxes benjamini is a jumping spider species in the genus Colaxes that was first identified in 2013.  It lives in South Africa.

References

Endemic fauna of South Africa
Salticidae
Spiders described in 2013
Spiders of South Africa
Taxa named by Wanda Wesołowska